Kevin Bureau-Poulin (born April 12, 1990) is a Canadian professional ice hockey goaltender who is currently playing with the  Laval Rocket of the American Hockey League (AHL). Poulin was selected by the National Hockey League (NHL)'s New York Islanders in the fifth round, 126th overall, of the 2008 NHL Entry Draft.

Playing career
Poulin first played major junior hockey in 2006 for the Victoriaville Tigres of the Quebec Major Junior Hockey League (QMJHL), posting a 3.34 Goals against average (GAA) and a .896 save percentage in 24 games. In 2008, Poulin was drafted by the New York Islanders in the fifth round, 126th overall, in the 2008 NHL Entry Draft. He continued to play in Victoriaville until his final year of major junior in 2010, posting 2.63 GAA and .916 save percentage, his best career QMJHL numbers.

Poulin began the 2010–11 season playing with the Islanders' American Hockey League (AHL) affiliate, the Bridgeport Sound Tigers, but on January 4, 2011, was recalled to the NHL due to an injury to Rick DiPietro. Poulin made his NHL debut on January 6, 2011, in relief against the Edmonton Oilers. His first NHL start was two days later on January 8 against the Colorado Avalanche. On February 8, he injured his knee during warmups and later had season ending surgery. On February 23, 2013, Poulin was recalled to replace DiPietro, who was placed on waivers a day before and then cleared waivers prior to being sent to the Sound Tigers.

As the backup for Evgeni Nabokov during the 2012–13 season, Poulin had one win, three losses and a 3.02 GAA and .893 save percentage in four starts for the Islanders, as well as relieving Nabokov once. Entering the Stanley Cup playoffs for the first time since 2007 as the eighth seed in the Eastern Conference against the top-seeded Pittsburgh Penguins, Poulin replaced Nabokov in Game 1. and Game 5, The Islanders were eliminated in six games. Poulin finished the playoffs with a 1.15 GAA and .933 save percentage.

On September 27, 2015, the Islanders placed Poulin on waivers for assignment to the AHL, where he was claimed by the Tampa Bay Lightning. On November 12, 2015, after playing no games for the Lightning, Poulin was traded to the Calgary Flames in exchange for future considerations.

On October 27, 2016, Poulin was signed by Barys Astana of the Kontinental Hockey League (KHL). He made 14 appearances for the club throughout the 2016–17 season. In October 2017, he was acquired by KHL Medveščak Zagreb, a Croatian team competing in the Austrian Hockey League. In late December 2017, he helped Team Canada win the prestigious Spengler Cup in Davos, coming up with an impressive performance in the championship game.

On January 14, 2018, Poulin left Medveščak Zagreb to join EHC Kloten of the Swiss National League for the remainder of the 2017–18 season. During the 2018–19 season Poulin posted a 22–20–0 record, with a 2.80 GAA and 0.915 save percentage for Eisbären Berlin.

Having returned to North America prior to the 2019–20 season, on December 26, 2019, the Grand Rapids Griffins signed Poulin to a professional tryout (PTO). He made 3 appearances with the Griffins before he was released from his try-out. On February 7, 2020, he was signed to his second PTO, joining the Ontario Reign, affiliate to the Los Angeles Kings. He was later signed to a one-year NHL contract with the Kings for the remainder of the season to serve as the Reign's backup on February 22, 2020. He appeared in 4 games with the Reign before the remainder of the 2019–20 season was cancelled due to the COVID-19 pandemic.

As a free agent from the Kings, Poulin opted to return to Europe by agreeing to an optional two-year contract with Swedish second-tier club, IF Björklöven of the HockeyAllsvenskan, on July 7, 2020. In the 2020–21 season, Poulin as the starting goaltender led IF Björklöven to a third place finish in the regular season, posting 20 wins through 30 appearances. He helped IF Björklöven advance to the qualification finals, before losing to Timrå IK.

On June 29, 2021, Poulin opted to end his tenure in Sweden, agreeing to a one-year contract with the Montreal Canadiens, AHL affiliate and hometown club the Laval Rocket. He split time with Rocket and the Canadiens' ECHL affiliate, the Trois-Rivières Lions. He was re-signed by the Rocket to a one-year contract extension for the 2022–23 season on July 19, 2022.

International play

During the 2017–18 season, Poulin was selected to represent Canada at the 2018 Winter Olympics in Pyeongchang, South Korea. Poulin collected 3 wins in 4 games to help Canada claim the bronze medal.

Career statistics

Regular season and playoffs

International

Awards and honours

References

External links

1990 births
Living people
Barys Nur-Sultan players
IF Björklöven players
Bridgeport Sound Tigers players
Canadian expatriate ice hockey players in Croatia
Canadian expatriate ice hockey players in Germany
Canadian expatriate ice hockey players in Switzerland
Canadian ice hockey goaltenders
Eisbären Berlin players
French Quebecers
Grand Rapids Griffins players
EHC Kloten players
Laval Rocket players
Olympic ice hockey players of Canada
Ice hockey players at the 2018 Winter Olympics
Olympic bronze medalists for Canada
Medalists at the 2018 Winter Olympics
Olympic medalists in ice hockey
KHL Medveščak Zagreb players
Ice hockey people from Montreal
New York Islanders draft picks
New York Islanders players
Stockton Heat players
Trois-Rivières Lions players
Victoriaville Tigres players